Crossroads is an unincorporated community located within Medford Township in Burlington County, New Jersey, United States. It is centered at the intersection of Medford-Mt. Holly Road (County Route 541) and Church Road (CR 616).

References

Medford, New Jersey
Unincorporated communities in Burlington County, New Jersey
Unincorporated communities in New Jersey